A sea serpent is a mythological sea creature either wholly or partly serpentine.

Sea Serpent or The Sea Serpent may refer to:

Sea Serpent (clipper), 1850 clipper ship which sailed in the San Francisco and China trade
Sea-Serpent, a steam yacht, formerly  (1904)
Sea Serpent (roller coaster), at Morey's Piers in Wildwood, New Jersey
Sea Serpent (roller coaster element), a double-inversion element with vertical loop halves connected by half corkscrews
Sea Serpent Cove, a cove in the South Sandwich Islands
The Sea Serpent, 1901 adventure novel by Jules Verne
The Sea Serpent (aka Hydra, the Sea Monster), a 1984 Spanish horror film directed by Amando de Ossorio
Sea Serpent, a variant of the Gabriel (missile) developed by Israel's IAI and Thales
Sea Serpent (ASW), a US Anti Submarine system.

See also
Hydrophiinae, or sea snakes
Phycodurus and Phyllopteryx, genera of fish, also known as sea snakes or seadragons
Hydrus, a Southern Hemisphere constellation, the 'lesser Water Snake', or sea snake
Oarfish
King of herrings
Sea serpent roll, a roller coaster inversion related to the cobra roll
Mare Anguis, or "Serpent Sea", a lunar mare on the near side of the moon